P. F. Pithawala was an actor who appeared in several movies made by Bombay Talkies in the 1930s and 1940s.

Filmography

External links
 

20th-century Indian male actors
Indian male film actors
Male actors in Hindi cinema
Place of birth missing (living people)
Possibly living people
Year of birth missing
Parsi people